Qaleh-ye Kazhdamak (also Romanized as Qal‘eh-ye Kazhdamak; also known as Qal‘eh Gazhdam) is a village in Howmeh-ye Sharqi Rural District, in the Central District of Izeh County, Khuzestan Province, Iran. At the 2006 census, its population was 276, in 46 families.

References 

Populated places in Izeh County